Sydmill Harris (born January 12, 1982 in Hoofddorp, Netherlands) is a Dutch former basketball player. After four years of college basketball with the Texas Longhorns, Harris played for Dutch Basketball League clubs Amsterdam Basketball, Matrixx Magixx and West-Brabant Giants. Harris is the son of Surinamese-born Dutch singer Oscar Harris.

Harris played 22 games for the Netherlands national team, after making his debut on 19 November 2000 against Belgium.

Honours
DBL Rookie of the Year (1): 2000–01

References

External links
eurobasket.com profile

1982 births
Living people
Dutch men's basketball players
Dutch sportspeople of Surinamese descent
Dutch Basketball League players
Matrixx Magixx players
West-Brabant Giants players
People from Haarlemmermeer
Guards (basketball)
Amsterdam Basketball players
Teramo Basket players
Sportspeople from North Holland
Dutch expatriate basketball people in the United States
Dutch expatriate basketball people in Italy